Biwia is a small genus of cyprinid fishes containing four species, three of which are endemic to Japan, and one of which (B. springeri) is endemic to Korea.

Species
 Biwia springeri (Bănărescu & Nalbant, 1973)
 Biwia tama (Ōshima, 1957)
 Biwia yodoensis Kawase & K. Hosoye, 2010
 Biwia zezera (Ishikawa, 1895)

References

 

 
Cyprinid fish of Asia
Freshwater fish of Japan
Taxa named by David Starr Jordan